Soil value or BWZ is a comparative assessment of soil quality used in Germany. It is determined from soil sampling data and ranges from 0 (very low) to 100 (very high).

According to the Geological Service of the state of North Rhine-Westphalia, the soil value of arable land is based on a field assessment framework which combines an assessment of soil type, soil condition (soil development) and the parent material of which the soil is composed. The result, the soil value, expresses the relative net income that, under normal and proper management, is determined only by the profitability of the soil. Additions or deductions in this value to take account of variations in yield due to terrain and climate (e.g. average annual temperature) give the field value (Ackerzahl).

Range of values 
The following colour scheme is used referring to the soil quality for certain ranges of values: 

The values exhibited by different types of soil are:

Origins 
As a yardstick for soil quality, a "Reich Standard Farm" was set up during the Third Reich in the parish of Eickendorf in the Magdeburger Börde, an exceptionally rich arable region. During the Reich Soil Assessment (Reichsbodenschätzung) following the Soil Assessment Act in 1934 a soil value of 100 was established in the leading Reich farm of Haberhauffe/Jäger. It was the basis of comparison for the tax rating of farms in Germany. Since this farm was no longer available for comparisons within West Germany after the Second World War, a farm in Machtsum near Harsum in the Hildesheim Börde was designated as the Federal Standard Farm. During later measurements, an even higher value of BWZ - 102.8 - was measured in Mölme, about 20 km east of Hildesheim within the municipality of Söhlde. It is the highest value ever recorded in Germany.

Another measure, the field value (Ackerzahl) is derived from the soil value, taking account of other factors such as climate and location e.g. along the edge of woodland.

See also 
 Soil classification
 Soil quality
 Soil science
 Soil Use Efficiency
 Crop yield

References

External links 
 Wertzahlen der Bodenschätzung at www.gd.nrw.de. Accessed on 2 Sep 2012.
 Eickendorf

Soil science
Pedology
Agronomy